L. indica may refer to:
 Lagerstroemia indica, the crape myrtle or crepe myrtle, a plant species
 Limnophila indica, a plant species in the genus Limnophila

See also
 Indica (disambiguation)